Disco Inferno is the fourth studio album by American soul-disco group, The Trammps, released in 1976 through Atlantic Records.

Commercial performance
The album peaked at No. 16 on the R&B albums chart. It also reached No. 46 on the Billboard 200. The album features the title track, which peaked at No. 9 on the Hot Soul Singles chart, No. 11 on the Billboard Hot 100, and No. 1 on the Hot Dance Club Play chart, and "I Feel Like I've Been Livin' (On the Dark Side of the Moon)", which charted at No. 52 on the Hot Soul Singles chart.

Track listing

Personnel
The Trammps
Jimmy Ellis – lead vocal
Robert Upchurch – lead and baritone vocal
Earl Young – bass vocal
Harold Wade – first tenor
Stanley Wade – second tenor

Additional personnel
Ronald Baker – bass
Earl Young – drums
Norman Harris, Bobby Eli, T.J. Tindall – guitars
Ron "Have Mercy" Kersey, T.G. Conway, Bruce Gray, Carlton Kent – keyboards
Larry Washington, Robert Cupit – congas
Allen Felder, Ronald Tyson – tambourines
Barbara Ingram, Carla Benson, Evette Benton – background vocals
Don Renaldo and His Strings and Horns
Flash Wilson – The Trammps' M.C.

Charts
Album

Singles

References

External links

1976 albums
The Trammps albums
Albums produced by Norman Harris
Albums recorded at Sigma Sound Studios
Atlantic Records albums